Jacques is the fifth studio album by the British singer-songwriter Marc Almond. It was released in December 1989. The album is a tribute to the Belgian singer-songwriter Jacques Brel and was instigated by Almond's collaboration with Paul Buck, who adapted Brel's original non-English lyrics specifically for Almond.

The songs for the album were recorded at Milo Studios, London, over four years. Almond was accompanied both by his assembled band (comprising "La Magia" and "Willing Sinners" members Annie Hogan, Billy McGee and Steve Humphreys) and various studio musicians. The artwork and cover painting was designed and painted by Johnny Deux.

Track listing

Personnel
 Marc Almond – vocals, all arrangements, song adaptation
 Annie Hogan – piano on tracks A1-A5, B1-B5
 Audrey Riley – cello, string arrangements on "The Town Fell Asleep"
 Martin McCarrick – cello, accordion
 Billy McGee – double bass, oboe arrangements, string arrangements on "The Devil (Okay)", "If You Go Away" and "The Town Fell Asleep"
 Steven Humphreys – drums, percussion
 Richard Riley – guitar
 Charles Gray – keyboards
 Julia Girdwood – oboe
 Gini Ball – violin
 Maurice Horhut – piano on "I'm Coming" and "My Death"
Technical
 Charles Gray – producer, all other instrument arrangements
 Jim Toler – engineer
 Johnny Deux – cover painting

References

1989 albums
Marc Almond albums
Covers albums
Some Bizzare Records albums
Rough Trade Records albums
Cultural depictions of Jacques Brel